Sainte-Agathe, Quebec may refer to:
 Sainte-Agathe-des-Monts, in the Laurentides region of Quebec
 Sainte-Agathe-de-Lotbinière, Quebec, in the Chaudière-Appalaches region, formed from the 1999 amalgamation of the village and parish named Sainte-Agathe